Vibrant Gujarat is a biennial investors' summit held by the Government of Gujarat in Gujarat, India. The event is aimed at bringing together business leaders, investors, corporations, thought leaders, policy and opinion makers; the summit is advertised as a platform to understand and explore business opportunities in Gujarat.

It entered its 9th edition in 2019.

2003
Vibrant Gujarat: Global Investors' Summit 2003 was organized during the Navratri festival.

The Industrial Extension Bureau acted as a nodal agency for the State Government during Vibrant Gujarat: Global Investors Summit (28 September to 2 October 2003) organized at the two major commercial cities of the State–Ahmedabad and Surat in association with the Government of India, United Nations Industrial Development Organization (UNIDO), Federation of Indian Chambers of Commerce & Industry (FICCI) & CII.

The conventions during the programme had sectoral sessions focus sector – Industrial Investment, Agro-Processing, Biotech- Pharma, Natural Gas and Oil, Infrastructure, Mining, Tourism, Apparels and Gems-Jewellery at Ahmedabad and sectoral sessions on Garment & Textiles and Gems & Jewellery at Surat . There were also exhibitions in above sectors at respective places in Ahmedabad and Surat to provide a platform for showcasing products and services. One-to-one discussions between the prospective investors, government officials and the project promoters took place.

176 project proposals were compiled and were then scrutinized for their viability. Internationally reputed credit rating agencies like CRISIL and CARE lend their support as the financial advisors to these projects. Leading private and public sector banks of India like ICICI, IDBI, State Bank of India, Bank of Baroda, State Bank of Saurashtra, Corporation Bank, IDFC and NABARD have extended their support for financing these projects. CRISIL also worked with iNDEXTb in structuring these projects.

The Deputy Prime Minister of India, Lal Krishna Advani inaugurated Vibrant Gujarat: Global Investors’ Summit 2003 on 28 September 2003. Narendra Modi, Chief Minister, Arun Shourie, Ram Naik, Mukesh Ambani, and A C Muthaih were the other dignitaries present on the dais. Various sessions during the programme were chaired by other ministers from the Union and State Government.

A large number of corporate leaders like Subhir Raha, C K Birla, CEOs of multinational companies like Shell, British Gas, General Motors, P&O ports, Niko & Steag and others attended the event. International dignitaries like Larry Pressler, ex-US Senator; Michael Clarke graced the occasion.

The Surat Summit, inaugurated by Union Finance Minister, Jaswant Singh. was also equally impressive. Other dignitaries present during the event were Union Minister for Textiles, Shah Nawaz Hussain, Union Minister for Rural Development Kashiram Rana, experts in textiles, gems and jewellery, senior officials from State and Central Government.

At the end of the event, 76 memorandums of understanding (MoU) worth US$14 billion for investment were signed.

Other events organized during Navratri festival were International Convention on Reconstruction in Kutch District after earthquake in 2001 and Celebration of Birth Anniversary of Mahatma Gandhi at Porbandar–the birthplace of Mahatma Gandhiji on his birthday anniversary on 2 October 2003.

About 125 foreign delegates, 200 Non-Resident Indians, 200 leading dignitaries and other participants from about 45 countries participated in Navratri festival.

2005
The two-day Vibrant Gujarat: Global Investor's Summit 2005 was a one-of-its- kind event in India. It got off to a start with the Honourable Vice President of India, Shri Bhairon Singh Shekhawat, inaugurating the ceremony. More than 6,000 people attended the inaugural ceremony. The dignitaries present at the ceremony included industry representatives, foreign multinationals, NRIs as well as the business ___ from various sections of the society, India. Mukesh Ambani of Reliance Industry, Gautam Adani of the Adani Group, Shashi Ruia of Essar, Nigel Shaw of British Gas and so on. MoUs for setting up projects worth INR 870 Billion were signed on the first day itself.

To invite participation from global players, five delegations Led by senior Ministers __ of Gujarat Cabinet visited different parts of the world to hold discussions with NRIs, NRGs (Non Residential Gujaratis) and foreign investors. From amongst them, several investors and NRIs participated in the event.

The summit was planned to coincide with Gujarat's famous Kite festival, Uttarayan, which marks a change of season with the movement of the sun into the northern hemisphere. Sectoral theme pavilions showcasing the strength of Gujarat in the relevant areas were developed. Major industries, Government corporations and Institutions participated in each sector. The event also hosted an exhibition along with seminars on the focus areas for investment in the state. These were IT, Biotech, Agro, Energy, Gas, Petroleum, Non-conventional Energy, Port & port-Led industries, Financial Services, Textiles and Apparels, Gems & Jewellery, Tourism etc. The exhibition was held at the Science City which have more than 200 exhibitors from various sectors. The exhibitions attracted visitors from within the state and outside.

Facility for arranging one to one meetings available where senior officers from the Industries and other departments, representatives of UNIDO and FICCI were present.

On the first day, the focus sectors were Information Technology, Biotechnology, Agro, Energy, Gas, Petroleum and more importantly Non-conventional Sources of Energy. Seminars and meetings were held in three different halls at the Science City. Potential investors and industrialists had one-to-one meetings with senior officials of the state government and ministers of the cabinet.

The concluding day maintained the same momentum and enthusiasm as that of the first day with MoUs being signed by Industry. Several new MoUs were signed in the focus sectors of the day–Agriculture, Engineering, Tourism, Urban Development, Chemicals and Pharmaceuticals, Port & Port Led development, Textiles, Gems & Jewellery.

By the time the Summit concluded on the second day, investments worth INR 1060 Billion in the form of MoUs were signed with 226 units. The concluding ceremony was graced by the Union Minister for Commerce & Industry Shri Kamal Nath,

Of the 226 MoUs, Engineering, Gas and Port sectors attracted the maximum number of investment proposals, followed by Agriculture, Urban Development, Tourism, Chemicals & Pharmaceuticals, Textiles, Gems & Jewellery, IT and Biotechnology sectors. Besides these, four industrial majors–Torrent, Essar, Welspun and Adani, have Ledged investments of INR 120 Billion in gas-based or lignite-based power projects, assuring self-sufficiency to the state for future in the most important sector – power.

Over all, the event evoked an excellent response amongst in industrialists in India and foreign countries in particular in Gujarat in general.

2007
The Government of Gujarat hosted the Vibrant Gujarat Global Investors' Summit 2007 on 12 and 13 January at Ahmedabad in which Gujarat emerged as a Global Investment Destination and justified its role as the Growth Engine of Indian Economy. This was the third such Summit organized by the state government with the first Summit held in 2003 and the second held in 2005.

In all the Summits, Gujarat was showcased as an ideal investment destination, both for Indian and Foreign investors. Prospective investors were extended two significant messages:
1. In Gujarat there is only Red Carpet and no Red Tape.
2. It is where Investors can sow a rupee and reap a dollar as returns.

Detailed investment opportunities in different segments of focus sectors were prepared and supplemented by individual project profiles to give comprehensive information about the state. These focus sectors included Agro & Food Processing; Engineering, Auto & Ceramics; Biotechnology; Textiles and Apparels, Gems & Jewellery; Tourism; IT; Power, Oil & Gas; Chemicals, Petrochemicals & Pharmaceuticals; SEZ & Port-Led Development and Urban Development.

The Vibrant Gujarat Global Investors’ Summit 2007 event was spread over a period of 4 days. On 10 January 2007, a multimedia exhibition-Eternal Gandhi–on life and philosophy of Mahatma Gandhi was inaugurated at Science city, Ahmedabad. On 11 January, an exhibition showcasing the strengths and advantages of the various industries in Gujarat named “Gujarat Discovered” and the International Kite festival at the Sabarmati Riverfront Development site was opened. 12 January saw the inauguration of Global Investors’ Summit at the Science city.

2009
The Government of Gujarat organized the 4th biennial Global Investors' Summit 2009 during 12–13 January 2009. Based on the theme–Gujarat Going Global and aimed at bringing together business leaders, investors, corporations, thought leaders, policy and opinion makers; the summit served as a perfect platform to understand and explore business opportunities with the State of Gujarat.

Vibrant Gujarat: Global Investors' Summit 2009 had resounding success this year too as it had been in the past. During the course of two days, 8662 MoUs worth US$243 billion (over Rs. 12,000 Billion) are signed. The summit witnessed participation of delegates from 45 countries, amounting to over 600 foreign delegates. The who's who of the Indian industry were present, including Ratan Tata, Chairman, Tata Group, KV Kamath, Chairman ICICI and President CII, Mukesh Ambani, Chairman, Reliance Industries, Kumar Mangalam Birla, Chairman, Birla Group, Shashi Ruia, Chairman, Essar Group, Mr, Anil Ambani, Chairman, ADAG Group, Sunil Mittal, Chairman, Bharti Enterprise among several other dignitaries. Several political dignitaries from various countries such as Japan, UK, China, Russia, Canada, Israel, Poland, Korea, UAE, Malawi, Indonesia, Oman, Kenya, Italy, Singapore, Trinidad & Tobago, Vietnam, Uganda, Zimbabwe and Maldives had participated

Japan was the Partner Country to this Summit. This being the first time any country has agreed to partner with a State of another country. Japan External Trade Organisation (JETRO) was designated as the partner organization. Japan also reciprocated Gujarat's initiatives for mutual economic cooperation by sending two senior level delegations, led by Hideaki Domichi, the Ambassador of Japan to India and Heizo Takenaka, Former Minister of Economic & Fiscal Policy of Japan. The maximum number of delegates was from Japan, totalling to over 70 members. Another major delegation was from USA.

The exhibition was organized in a grand way, spread over an area of 19,200 sq. mts. There were 232 stalls, quite impressive and informative, having participation of eminent companies of India. Sixteen countries participated in the exhibition from countries such as Japan, Korea, UK, Kenya, Arab League, Russia, Netherlands, Trinidad & Tobago, Czech Republic, El Salvador and Uganda.

Earlier Summits were organized in the year 2003, 2005 and 2007. The 2003 Global Investors' Summit was held coinciding with the glorious Navratri festival where a total of 76 MoUs worth US$14 billion were signed. The 2005 Summit saw signing of 226 MoUs garnering an investment of US$20 billion. The year 2007 Summit, resulted in signing of 675 MoUs worth US$152 billion. In the year 2009, the initiative that began six years ago, was intensified and the state propelled into the next stage of the development process, focused and intensive growth in the socio-economic index.

2011
Vibrant Gujarat 2011 Summit was held at Gandhinagar on 12–13 January 2011. It is to be held at a special site dedicated for Vibrant Gujarat named Mahatma mandir situated at Gandhinagar sector 13. About 7936 MoUs were signed worth $462 billion in the two days.

2013
Vibrant Gujarat 2013 Summit was held for the second time in Gandhinagar on 12–13 January 2013 Mahatma mandir. Besides Gujarat it will also host a Number of other Indian  states Like Karnataka and Developed and Developing Countries like Mozambique, Canada, United Kingdom, Japan.

2015
The 7th Vibrant Gujarat Summit  was planned during 11 to 13 January 2015 at Mahatma Mandir, Gandhinagar, Gujarat, India. Six summits held so far had been a resounding success and immensely contributed to the transformation of Gujarat into a "Global Business Hub". The prime focus of Government of Gujarat was Inclusive development and the key areas for development identified included: Innovation, Sustainability, Youth & Skill Development, Knowledge Sharing and Networking. This Summit was an ideal platform for other states and countries to showcase their strengths, highlight business opportunities, facilitate knowledge dissemination etc.

Apart from Summit, Vibrant Gujarat is also known for the Trade Shows. Every year 2000+ Companies do participate in this exhibition, and around 1 million visitors participated in Vibrant Gujarat 2015.

Details about participation of prominent foreign dignitaries and their views about VG & Gujarat

Over 25,000 Delegates from India and 110 other countries participated in the 7th Vibrant Gujarat Summit 2015. Following are the dignitaries and diplomats who marked their presence in Vibrant Gujarat 2015:

 a.	Mr. Narendra Modi, Hon’ble Prime Minister
 b.	Mr. Tshering Tobgay, Hon’ble Prime Minister, Bhutan
 c.	Mr. Nikola Gru`evski, Hon’ble Prime Minister, Republic of Macedonia
 d.	Mr. Ban Ki Moon, Secretary General, United Nations
 e.	Mr. John Kerry, Secretary of State, USA
 f.	Mr. Jim Yong Kim, President, World Bank 
 g.	Mr. Sam Walsh, CEO, Rio Tinto, Australia
 h.	Mr. Mukesh Ambani, Chairman, Reliance Industries Ltd.
 i.	Mr. Kumar MangalamBirla, Chairman, Aditya Birla Group
 j.	Mr. Ajaypal Singh Banga, President, USIBC
 k.	Mr.Yosuke Takagi, Hon’ble State Minister, Ministry of Economy, Trade & Industry, Govt. of Japan

John Kerry, Secretary of State, USA, said, 
“PM Modi’s Sabka Saath Sabka Vikas sounds like a pretty slogan for all of us to adopt.”

Jim Yong Kim, President, World Bank, said, 
“We believe India should be the leader in eliminating poverty; it’s a radical and unique opportunity over the next decade.”

Mukesh Ambani, Chairman, Reliance Industries Ltd., said,
“I urge each and every investor to follow our path and invest in Gujarat, just as we did.”

Tshering Tobgay, Hon’blePrime Minister, Bhutan, said, 
“I am here on my economic pilgrimage”

Sam Walsh, CEO, Rio Tinto, Australia, said, 
“We will add 30,000 Jobs in diamond cutting industry in Gujarat. Looking forward to impetus that Vibrant Gujarat will provide.”

Yosuke Takagi, Hon’bleState Minister, Ministry of Economy, 
Trade & Industry, Govt. of Japan, said, “Japan is incomplete without India, India is incomplete without Japan.”

2017
After organizing seven successful Summits, Government of Gujarat moved further in its journey towards sustainable long-term growth and inclusive development by organizing the 8th edition of Vibrant Gujarat Global Summit from 10 to 13 January 2017 at Mahatma mandir, Gandhinagar. The central focus of the 8th edition of the Vibrant Gujarat Global Summit was “Sustainable Economic and Social Development”. The Summit brought together Heads of States and Governments, Ministers, Leaders of the Corporate World, Senior Policy Makers, Heads of International Institutions and Academia from around the world to further the cause of development and promote cooperation.

Gujarat Chief Minister Vijay Rupani declared conclusion of the 8th edition of Vibrant Gujarat Global Summit, at Mahatma Mandir on 12 January 2017, on a politically confident note, by inviting all the guests for the next edition of the biennial event in January 2019 even as the state is scheduled to go for assembly elections in 2017. A total of 25,578 Memorandum of Understanding (MoUs) were declared to have been signed by different industrial units. Out of the signed MOUs, 18,533 were from MSME sector, 5,938 from the large-scale sector and 1,107 MOUs were for strategic and technological partnership sector. However, the number of the total worth of MOUs was not declared.

2019 
9th Vibrant Gujarat Global Summit is scheduled on 18–20 January 2019. Vibrant Gujarat Global Summit 2019 (VGGS) expects to see commitment of investments worth a whopping Rs 50,000 crore in the renewable energy sector in the state. This year United Arab Emirates, Uzbekistan & Morocco are the partner countries for 9th edition of Vibrant Gujarat. The venue for 9th Vibrant Gujarat Global Summit is Mahatma Mandir, Gandhinagar.
Kiran vora Solvay S.A., is likely to sign Rs 560-cr MoU for setting up Dahej plant. also MoU for country's first CNG terminal to be signed at Vibrant summit 2019. President of Uzbekistan Shavkat Mirziyoyev attended the Vibrant Gujarat international investment summit as a key guest in a first Central Asian country to participate as a country partner in the flagship investment summit of Gujarat.

See also

Global Investors Summit
Make In Maharashtra
Make in India

References

External links 

Official site
 Investor Facilitation Portal (IFP): Single window mechanism for those who wants to invest in Gujarat. An online Memorandum of Understanding (MoU) filling system and a system to check the status of applications by state authorities and investors.
Gujarat 2050 Map showing major development areas
Gujarat: Cos sign 21,000 MoUs to invest Rs 25 lakh cr
 of PM’s speech at Vibrant Gujarat Summit 2015

Economy of Gujarat
History of Gujarat (1947–present)
Business conferences in India
Slogans